Kenneth or Kenny Davidson may refer to:

 Kenneth Davidson (mathematician), professor of pure mathematics at the University of Waterloo
 Walter Davidson (Canadian politician) (Kenneth Walter Davidson, born 1937), former political figure in British Columbia, Canada
 Kenneth Davidson (cricketer) (1905–1954), English cricketer
 Kenneth S. M. Davidson, mechanical engineering professor
 Kenny Davidson (American football) (born 1967), former American football defensive end
 Kenny Davidson (Scottish footballer) (born 1952)
 W. K. Davidson, known as Kenny, American restaurateur and Illinois politician